North Shore Road may mean:
Nevada State Route 28, along the north shore of Lake Tahoe
Nevada State Route 167, along the north shore of Lake Mead
Nevada State Route 169, along the north shore of Lake Mead
an unfinished road along the north shore of Fontana Lake, within Great Smoky Mountains National Park in North Carolina